Zanbalan or Zonbalan may refer to:
 Zanbalan, East Azerbaijan
 Zonbalan, West Azerbaijan